This is a list of women photographers who were born in Germany or whose works are closely associated with that country.

A
 Louise Abel (1841–1907), German-born Norwegian photographer
 Gertrud Arndt (1903–2000), created self-portraits from around 1930
 Ursula Arnold (1929–2012), street scenes in Berlin and Leipzig during the German Democratic Republic
 Ellen Auerbach (1906–2004), see United States

B
 Tina Bara (born 1962), freelance artistic photographer
 Uta Barth (born 1958), art photography
 Carla Bartheel (1902–1983), film actress and photographer
 Hilla Becher (1934–2015), together with her brother Bernd, produced typologies of industrial buildings and structures
 Bertha Beckmann (1815–1901), possibly Germany's first professional woman photographer
 Katharina Behrend (1888–1973), see Netherlands
 Sibylle Bergemann (1941–2010), chronicler of social life in East Germany
 Ella Bergmann-Michel (1896–1971), abstract painter, photographer, filmmaker
 Ruth Bernhard (1905–2006), German-born American lesbian photographer
 Emilie Bieber (1810–1884), pioneer who opened a studio in Hamburg as early as 1852
 Aenne Biermann (1898–1933), of the New Objectivity movement
 Ilse Bing (1899–1998), versatile photographer (fashion, architecture, etc.) from the 1920s to the 1950s, often using remarkable compositions
 Anna Blume (1937–2011), staged photographs and installations, often depicting herself and her husband Bernhard
 Dorothy Bohm (born 1924), see United Kingdom
 Jenny Bossard-Biow (1813 – after 1858), possibly the first woman in Germany to have made daguerreotypes
 Marianne Breslauer (1909–2001), active in the early 1930s
 Käthe Buchler (1876–1930), documented WWI in Braunschweig, Germany
 Traude Bührmann (born 1942), writer, journalist, photographer

C
Gladys Chai von der Laage (born 1953), sports photographer
Rosemarie Clausen (1907–1990), theatre and portrait photographer

D
 Wanda von Debschitz-Kunowski (1870–1935), portrait photographer, educator
 Minya Diez-Dührkoop (1873–1929), professional photographer with a studio in Berlin

E
 Frauke Eigen (born 1969), photographer of the aftermath of war in Kosovo

F
 Claudia Fährenkemper (born 1959), landscape photographer
 Gertrude Fehr (1895–1996), did solarisation photos
 Gisèle Freund (1908–2000), see France

G
 Marie Goslich (1859–1936), photographer of social issues, etc., for magazines
 Sophia Goudstikker (1865–1924), portraitist and women's rights activist
 Liselotte Grschebina (1908–1994), see Israel
 Julia Gunther (born 1979), documentary photographer

H
 Lisel Haas (1898–1989), German-born Jewish photographer who moved to Britain
 Esther Haase (born 1966), photographer, film director
Elisabeth Hase (1905–1991), commercial and documentary photographer
 Sandra Hastenteufel (born 1966), contemporary artist, photographer
 Roswitha Hecke (born 1944), photojournalist
 Annemarie Heinrich (1912–2005), see Argentina
 Nanna Heitmann (born 1994)
 Lotte Herrlich (1883–1956), photographer of naturism during the 1920s
 Juliane Herrmann (born 1989), photographer curating photography exhibitions
 Hannah Höch (1889–1978), pioneer of photomontage, participated in the Dada movement
 Marta Hoepffner (1912–2000), artist, photographer
 Candida Höfer (born 1944), highly precise large-format depictions of guest workers in Germany, interiors, zoos, capturing the psychology of social architecture
 Sabine Hornig (born 1964), photographer and contemporary artist depicting architecture and urban life
 Walde Huth (1923–2011), fashion photographer

J
 Lotte Jacobi (1896–1990), initially family photography, then shots of Tajikistan and Uzbekistan, from 1935 studio in Manhattan, portraits of celebrities
 Charlotte Joël (c. 1882–1943), Jewish portrait photographer

K
Ingeborg Kahlenberg (1920–1996), photographer for the Dutch resistance
Johanna Keimeyer (born 1982), photographer, artist
 Annette Kelm (born 1975), contemporary artist, photographer
 Astrid Kirchherr (1938–2020), photographed the Beatles before they became famous
 Emma Kirchner (1830 - 1909), trained in Leipzig, moved to Netherlands as first woman photographer in Delft area
 Barbara Klemm (active 1959–2004), press photographer
 Katrin Korfmann (born 1971), fine art photographer
 Monika Kropshofer (born 1952), painter, photographer
 Germaine Krull (1897–1985), photographer, activist
 Marie Kundt (1870–1932), photographer, educator

L
 Lisa Larsen (1925–1959), pioneering woman photojournalist
 Erna Lendvai-Dircksen (1883–1962), photographer of rural individuals, collected in books that sold well in the Nazi period
 Esther Levine (born 1970), urban and street photography
 Alice Lex-Nerlinger (1893–1975), artist in the media of painting, photography, photomontage and photograms
 Annelise Löffler (1914–2000), active in the world of dance
 Barbara Luisi (fl 2000s), photographer and musician
 Loretta Lux (born 1969), fine art photographer known for surreal portraits of young children
 Rut Blees Luxemburg (born 1967), photographer of night scenes

M
 Melanie Manchot (born 1966), specializes in photographs of people in public, sometimes inviting them to undress
 Jeanne Mandello (1907–2001), modern experimental photographer, studio in Paris, later moved to South America
 Anne Menke (born 1967), German-born editorial photographer, based in New York
 Hansel Mieth (1909–1998), see United States
 Lucia Moholy (1894–1989), see Czechoslovakia, Czech Republic
 Hedda Morrison (1908–1991), early photographs of Peking, Hong Kong and Sarawak, later lived and exhibited in Australia

N
 Cathleen Naundorf (born 1968), artist and photographer
 Anja Niedringhaus (1965–2014), photojournalist, Pulitzer Prize winner
 Simone Nieweg (born 1962), landscape photographer
 Margret Nissen (born 1938), photographer of architecture
 Sonya Noskowiak (1900–1975), German-American photographer

O
 Hildegard Ochse (1935–1997), freelance photographer, educator
 Li Osborne (1883–1968), German-born British photographer and sculptor

P
 Helga Paris (born 1938), photographer specializing in East-German street scenes
 Angelika Platen (born in 1942), portrait photographer
 Bettina Pousttchi (born 1971), German-Iranian sculptor, photographer, filmmaker
 Barbara Probst (born 1964), contemporary artist, photographer
 Anne-Katrin Purkiss (born 1959), portrait photographer

R
 Katja Rahlwes (born 1967), fashion photographer
 Elfriede Reichelt (1883–1953), fine art photographer
 Claudia Reinhardt (born 1964), contemporary photographer
 Regina Relang (1906–1989), fashion photographer
 Evelyn Richter (1930–2021), art photographer active in social documentary photography
 Ursula Richter (1886–1946), dance and theatre photography in Dresden
 Leni Riefenstahl (1902–2003), film director and dancer who also published photos of the Nuba tribes in Sudan and, later, marine life
 Frieda Riess (1890–c. 1955), German portrait photographer in the 1920s with a studio in central Berlin
 Tata Ronkholz (1940–1997)
 Hildegard Rosenthal (1913–1990), German photographer who became a photojournalist and a noted photographer after her emigration to Brazil.

S
 Eva Sandberg-Xiao (1911–2001), photographer in Russia and China
 Thyra Schmidt (born 1974), art photography and new media artist
 Stefanie Schneider (born 1968), photographer of the American west
 Ursula Schulz-Dornburg (born 1938), photographer in black and white
 Gundula Schulze Eldowy (born 1954), art photographer
 Hanni Schwarz (born c. 1901), nude and portrait photographer
 Else Seifert (1879–1968), architectural photographer
 Heji Shin (born 1976), art and fashion photographer
 Katharina Sieverding (born 1944), self-portraitist
 Annegret Soltau (born 1946), stitched photomontages of the human body
 Grete Stern (1904–1999), see Argentina
 Liselotte Strelow (1908–1981), employed by Kodak

T
 Gerda Taro (1910–1937), early female war photographer, remembered for her coverage of the Spanish Civil War, especially Valencia, published in Life and  Illustrated London News
 Elsa Thiemann (1910–1981), street photographer who trained at the Bauhaus
 Abisag Tüllmann (1935–1996), photojournalist

U
 Ellen von Unwerth (born 1954), photographer of erotic femininity

V
 Jutta Vialon (1917–2004), based in Bremen
 Christa Frieda Vogel (born 1960), documentary photographer

W
 Bertha Wehnert-Beckmann (1815–1901), Germany's first professional female photographer with a studio in Leipzig from 1843
 Anna Werner (born 1941), associated with Der Harem
 Marianne Wex (1937–2020), feminist photographer and author
 Ruth Wilhelmi (1904–1977), stage photographer
 Madeline Winkler-Betzendahl (1899–1995), fashion and stage photographer
 Anne Winterer (1894–1938), studio in Düsseldorf, portraits, industrial subjects
 Ursula Wolff Schneider (1906–1977), photographer and photojournalist

Y
 Yva (1900–c. 1942), German Jewish photographer, multiple exposed images

Z
 Bertha Zillessen (1872–1936)
 Bettina von Zwehl (born 1971), portrait photographer, based in London

See also
 List of women photographers

-
German women photographers, List of
Photographers
Photographers